Han Schuil (born 12 February 1958, Voorschoten) is a Dutch multimedia artist, who works in a Dutch tradition of compactness and tension in painting.

Biography 
From 1979 to 1981 Schuil attended the Academie voor Beeldende Kunsten in Rotterdam, the predecessor of the Willem de Kooning Academy. He went on from there to Ateliers '63, a postgraduate program in Haarlem, where he worked from 1981 to 1983. He made his debut in 1983 at the gallery Art & Project.

In his early career, Schuil worked on canvas. After experimenting with wood, aluminium, and copper, he has opted for aluminium since 1985, because it provides a smooth surface for painting. The shapes formed by aluminium often play a central role in Schuil’s work. Examples include the folded edges and the seams and rivets in the aluminium, which sometimes run straight through the picture plane. 

Over time, Schuil has also shown a growing tendency to have the support protrude into three-dimensional space. Schuil frequently treats the aluminium before painting it, making dents and holes that become integral parts of the picture. “I use them not to emphasize the thingness of the picture, but because they fit into the picture,” Schuil told Dominic van den Boogerd in 2000.

In the mid-1990s, Schuil’s work became more complex. By mirroring, doubling, and combining motifs, he fashioned increasingly elaborate and baroque compositions. In addition to creating these intricate works, he has also continued to draw on the plainer pictorial language of his early years.

Work 
The origins of Schuil’s artistic themes lie in everyday reality and range from comic strips, video games, and computer graphics to road markings, a skating suit, an infrared photograph, and an MRI scan. Writer and curator Lynne Cooke described how these motives relate to Schuils work.
 “The particular object which struck Schuil forcibly enough to provide the genesis for this images is, as so often in his work, not readily or precisely identifiable, though its very mundanity invests the resulting work with what might be deemed the visual counterpart to that feeling of having something on the tip of one’s tongue - something at the corner of one’s eye? -, the reverberation of something well-known that nevertheless eludes identification, that resists naming. Displaced metaphors, elusive visual memories, connotations conjured the countered or otherwise undermined, the depicted and the actual held in ambivalent equivocation: these are some of the principal means by which Han Schuil affirms the inclusive and contemporary nature of abstract art, while at the same time respecting the logic of pictorial coherence and objecthood as prescribed by a formalist aesthetic”  

According to Bert Jansen "the meaning they have in the real life is lost as soon as the feature as signs in a Han Schuil Painting." Rudi Fuchs, former director of the Stedelijk Museum in Amsterdam placed Schuil in a Dutch tradition of compactness and tension in painting.

Exhibitions 
Solo (selection)
 1983-1996 Art & Project, Amsterdam, The Netherlands
 1985 Galerie 't Venster, Rotterdam, The Netherlands
 1987 Museum Fodor, Amsterdam, The Netherlands
 1990, 1991 Germans van Eck Gallery, New York, USA
 1995 until now Galerie Onrust, Amsterdam, The Netherlands
 2000 Schilderijen / Paintings1983-1999, Stedelijk Museum Amsterdam, The Netherlands
 2000, 2004 Gallery Conrads, Düsseldorf, Germany
 2008 Crashed and Gobsmacked, Museum Jan Cunen, Oss, The Netherlands
 2011, 2013 Gallery Hamish Morrison, Berlin, Germany
 
Group Exhibition
 1985 'Wat Amsterdam betreft', Stedelijk Museum Amsterdam, The Netherlands
 1987 'XIX Bienal de São Paulo', São Paulo, Brazil
 1991 'Negen', Witte de With, Rotterdam, The Netherlands
 1992 'Moments d'abstraccio', Palau de la Virreina, Barcelona, Spain
 1994 'L'orrizonte', Castello di Rivoli, Turin, Italy
 1995 'Couplet 4', Stedelijk Museum Amsterdam, The Netherlands
 1999 'Panorama 2000', Centraal Museum, Utrecht, The Netherlands
 1999 'Troublespot Painting', MUHKA, Antwerp, Belgium
 2004 'Encounter with Modernism', Shanghai Art Museum, Singapore Art Museum, Pinacoteca do Estado de São Paulo en Museu de Arte Moderna do Rio de Janeiro
 2005 'Later on we shall simplify things', Centre Cultural, Andratx, Mallorca, Stadsgalerij Heerlen, The Netherlands
 2009 'Real/Painting', S.M.A.K., Ghent, Belgium
 2013 'Van Dumas tot Cobra, Collectie De Heus-Zomer', Singer Museum, Laren, The Netherlands

Collections 
Work by the artist is held in various public and private collections
 Stedelijk Museum, Amsterdam, The Netherlands
 Museum Boijmans van Beuningen, Rotterdam, The Netherlands
 Gemeentemuseum Den Haag, The Hague, The Netherlands
 Bonnefantenmuseum, Maastricht, The Netherlands
 Lakenhal, Leiden, The Netherlands
 Museum Jan Cunen, Oss, The Netherlands
 Centraal Museum, Utrecht, The Netherlands
 Stedelijk Museum Schiedam, Schiedam, The Netherlands
 Rijksmuseum Twente, Enschede, The Netherlands
 Museum voor Moderne Kunst, Brussels, Belgium
 S.M.A.K., Ghent, Belgium
 Boston Museum of Fine Arts, Boston, USA
 Collection KPN, The Hague, The Netherlands
 Instituut Collectie Nederland, The Netherlands
 Collection Jo en Marlies Eyck, The Netherlands
 Collection ABN/Amro, The Netherlands
 Collection AEGON, The Netherlands
 Collection Akzo Nobel Art Foundation, The Netherlands
 Collection De Heus-Zomer, The Netherlands
 Caldic Collection, The Netherlands

Bibliography 
 Han Schuil, Material Metaphors, Lynne Cooke, Fodor Magazine, 1987
 Han Schuil, Schilderijen - Paintings 1983-1999, text: Rudi Fuchs, Dominic van den Boogerd, Bert Jansen, Stedelijk Museum Amsterdam, NAI publishers, Rotterdam, 2000
 Han Schuil, Blast, text: Paul Kempers, Galerie Onrust, Amsterdam, 2009
 Han Schuil, Gemälde - Paintings, text: Ulrich Loock Hamish Morrison Galerie, Berlin, 2011
 Han Schuil, Gemälde/paintings, text: Birgit Sonna, Galerie Andreas Binder, München, 2012

References

External links 

 www.hanschuil.nl
 Short film Rudolf Evenhuis

1958 births
Living people
Dutch artists
Willem de Kooning Academy alumni
People from Voorschoten